The Prosecutor General's Office of Kyrgyzstan is a Kyrgyz government agency which is responsible for maintaining and supervising the public procurator system in Kyrgyzstan. The Prosecutor General of Kyrgyzstan is the highest government judicial official in Kyrgyzstan, who oversees the enforcement of the Kyrgyz legal system and the activities of law enforcement agencies. The Prosecutor General is nominated by the President of Kyrgyzstan and is confirmed by the Supreme Council. The office is located on 139 Toktonaliyev Street in the capital of Bishkek.

Duties
The Office of the Prosecutor General is responsible for:

Representing both the state and the general public in the court of law
Supervise the observance of laws by law enforcement bodies in Kyrgyzstan 
Supervision of the observance of laws in criminal cases
Ensure the personal liberties of citizens are being identified and respected

History
On November 29, 1924, Mikhail Beznosikov was appointed the first prosecutor of the Kara-Kirghiz Autonomous Oblast, the precursor to the current prosecutor general's office. In 1936, the prosecutor's office, along with other law enforcement bodies formed the prosecutor's office of the Kirghiz SSR. As a result of the Declaration on State Sovereignty of the Kyrgyz Republic on 15 December 1990, the regional prosecution authorities in Kyrgyzstan distinguished themselves and gave themselves precedence over the Procurator General of the Soviet Union. In December 1993, the Jogorku Kenesh passed a law which saw the formalization of national legal prosecution bodies in independent Kyrgyzstan. Its functions were defined in law in July 2000. In light of the Tulip Revolution and the Kyrgyz Revolution of 2010, the office's main tasks were focused mostly on fighting government corruption.

List of Prosecutors General

Sources

External Links

Site of The Office of the Prosecutor General

Government of Kyrgyzstan
Law enforcement in Kyrgyzstan
Prosecution